Chabanel station is a commuter rail station operated by Exo in Montreal, Quebec, Canada. It serves the Saint-Jérôme line. Its name comes from Chabanel street, the street that the station is located on. It is relatively close to the Ahuntsic station, though they are not considered as a transfer site.

Connecting bus routes

Société de transport de Montréal (STM)

References

External links 

  Chabanel Commuter Train Station Information (RTM)
  Chabanel Commuter Train Station Schedule (RTM)
 2016 STM System Map

Exo commuter rail stations
Railway stations in Montreal
Ahuntsic-Cartierville
Railway stations in Canada opened in 2007